The Asia Pacific Telecommunity (APT) was founded on the joint initiatives of the United Nations Economic and Social Commission for Asia and the Pacific (UNESCAP), and the International Telecommunication Union (ITU).
 
After the treaty came into force, APT was formally organized on 1 July 1979. The APT is an intergovernmental organization and operates in conjunction with telecom service providers, manufacturers of communications equipment, and research and development organizations active in the field of communication, information and innovation technologies.
 
APT serves as the organization for information and communications technology (ICT) in the region. The APT covers 38 Members, 4 Associate Members, and 137 Affiliate Members.
 
Throughout the past years, APT has been able to assist members in the preparation of Global conferences such as ITU Plenipotentiary Conference (PP), World Telecommunication Development Conference (WTDC), World Radiocommunication Conference (WRC), World Summit on the Information Society (WSIS), World Telecommunication Standardization Assembly (WTSA), and the ITU meetings. APT is also involved in promoting regional harmonization of their programmes and activities in the region.

Membership
There are currently 38 Members (countries), 4 Associate Members, and 137 Affiliate Members in the APT. Any member of the ESCAP which is within the region is eligible to be part of the APT while to be an associate member, any territory, part or group of territories within the region which is an associate member of ESCAP is eligible. Associate members are highlighted in green. A state becomes a member of APT by ratifying the founding treaty, the Constitution of the Asia-Pacific Telecommunity.

Objective
The objective of the Telecommunity shall be to foster the development of telecommunication services and information infrastructure throughout the region with a particular focus on the expansion thereof in less developed areas.
 
In furtherance thereof, the Telecommunity may:
 Promote the expansion of telecommunication services and information infrastructure and the maximization of the benefits of information and telecommunications technology for the welfare of the people in the region;
 Develop regional cooperation in areas of common interest, including radio communications and standards development;
 Undertake studies relating to developments in telecommunication and information infrastructure technology and policy and regulation in coordination with other international organizations, where pertinent;
 Encourage technology transfer, human resource development and the exchange of information for the balanced development of telecommunication services and information infrastructure within the region; and
 Facilitate coordination within the region with regard to major issues pertaining to telecommunication services and information infrastructure with a view to strengthening the region's international position.

Structure
The APT has three major functioning organs: the General Assembly, Management Committee, and General Secretariat. The General Assembly consists of the President and the Vice Presidents; the Management Committee consists of the Chairman and the Vice Chairmen; the General Secretariat consists of the Secretary General, the Deputy Secretary General and other professional staff.

The APT is divided into five sectors each managing different aspects of the matter handled by the Telecommunity. These sectors are Policy and Regulations (PRF), Radiocommunication (RF), Standardization, Human Resource Development (HRD), and ICT Development (APTICT).

Leadership
The APT is headed by a Secretary General who is elected to a three-year term by the Member States at the General Assembly.

Chief Executives
  Loqman Husain T.Q.A, Leg d’Hon
  Boonchoo Phienpanji
  Chao Thongma
  Hiroyasu Sonoki
  Jong Soon Lee
  Amarendra Narayan
  Toshiyuki Yamada
  Areewan Haorangsi
  Masanori Kondo

See also
African Telecommunications Union (ATU)
European Conference of Postal and Telecommunications Administrations (CEPT)
Inter-American Telecommunication Commission (CITEL)
List of telecommunications regulatory bodies

References

Telecommunications organizations
International organizations based in Asia
Intergovernmental organizations established by treaty
Organizations established in 1979